Issi Ka Naam Dunia Hai is a 1962 Hindi film starring Ashok Kumar, Shyama in lead roles and directed by Shakti Samanta.

Soundtrack

References

External links
 

Films directed by Shakti Samanta
Films scored by Ravi
1962 films
1960s Hindi-language films